Coulters Dean is a  biological Site of Special Scientific Interest south-east of Buriton in Hampshire. It is part of the  Coulters Dean nature reserve, which is managed by the Hampshire and Isle of Wight Wildlife Trust.

This is chalk grassland on a west facing slope of the South Downs. It has a rich flora and invertebrate fauna, which has been recorded periodically since 1914. Flowering plants include horseshoe vetch, rampion, clustered bellflower and at least eleven species of orchid.

References

 

Hampshire and Isle of Wight Wildlife Trust
Sites of Special Scientific Interest in Hampshire